Wellington is the stage name of various Brazilian footballers:

Wellington Amorim (born 1977), Brazilian football forward
Wellington Monteiro (born 1978), Brazilian football defensive midfielder
Wellington (footballer, born June 1981), full name Wellington Damião Nogueira Marinho, Brazilian football centre-back
Wellington (footballer, born September 1981), full name Wellington Katzor de Oliveira, Brazilian football midfielder
Wellington (footballer, born January 1982), full name Wellington Pinto Fraga, Brazilian football midfielder
Wellington (footballer, born June 1982), full name Wellington Dantas de Jesus, Brazilian football midfielder
Wellington (footballer, born September 1982), full name Wellington da Silva Serezuella, Brazilian football attacking midfielder
Wellington Paulista (born 1984), Brazilian football striker
Wellington (footballer, born 1985), full name Wellington Santos da Silva, Brazilian football left-back
Wellington (footballer, born 1987), full name Wellington Carlos da Silva, Brazilian football striker
Wellington Silva (footballer, born 1987), Brazilian football forward
Wellington Adão (born 1988), Brazilian football forward
Wellington (footballer, born 1988), full name Wellington Luís de Sousa, Brazilian football forward
Wellington Silva (footballer, born 1988), Brazilian football right-back
Wellington (footballer, born 1989), full name Wellington Oliveira dos Reis, Brazilian football defender
Wellington Baroni (born 1989), Brazilian football defender
Wellington Júnior (born 1989), Brazilian football forward
Wellington (footballer, born January 1991), full name Wellington Aparecido Martins, Brazilian football defensive midfielder
Wellington (footballer, born September 1991), full name Wellington da Silva Pinto, Brazilian football centre-back
Wellington (footballer, born 1992), full name Wellington Nascimento Carvalho, Brazilian football forward
Wellington Rato (born 1992), Brazilian football midfielder
Wellington (footballer, born 1993), full name Wellington Cézar Alves de Lima, Brazilian football defensive midfielder
Wellington Silva (footballer, born 1993), Brazilian football winger
Wellington (footballer, born 1994), full name Wellington Walter Nogueira, Brazilian football forward
Wellington (footballer, born 1995), full name Wellington Ferreira Nascimento, Brazilian football centre-back
Wellington Luís (born 1995), Brazilian football goalkeeper
Wellington Tim (born 2001), Brazilian football centre-back

See also
 Whelliton (born 1972), Brazilian football forward
 Weligton (born 1979), Brazilian football centre-back
 Tom (footballer, born 1985), full name Wellington Brito da Silva, Brazilian football winger
 Welliton (born 1986), Brazilian football forward
 Wellington (disambiguation)
 Welinton (disambiguation)

Given names